This is a list of Pakistani Canadians.

Academics
 Sajida Alvi – academic of Pakistani origin in Canada; historian of Islam in South Asia
 Naz Ikramullah
 Rukhsana Khan – children's author and storyteller
 Munir Sheikh – 10th Chief Statistician of Canada, replaced Ivan Fellegi
 Naweed Syed – Professor at and Head of Department of Cell Biology & Anatomy at the University of Calgary; first person to connect brain cells to a silicon chip
Zulfiqar Bhutta – Professor at the Department of Nutritional Sciences and the Division of Epidemiology, Dalla Lana School of Public Health of the University of Toronto.
M. Omair Shafiq – School of Information Technology, Carleton University

Arts and fashion

Pageants
 Sonia Ahmed – President of Miss Pakistan World, Mrs. Pakistan World
 Sara Ghulam  – Miss World Canada 2007

Models
 Yasmeen Ghauri – Victoria's Secret supermodel

Urdu poets
 Musharraf Ali Farooqi – writer and translator
 Shan-ul-Haq Haqqee
 Ashfaq Hussain – Urdu poet

Entertainment and media

Film
 Hamza Haq – actor
 Sitara Hewitt – actress
 Omar Majeed – filmmaker
 Ali Mukaddam – actor
 Zarqa Nawaz – director and producer; known for CBC serial Little Mosque on the Prairie
 Zaib Shaikh – actor
 Kris Siddiqi – actor and comedian
 Sindhyar Memon - actor
 Iman Vellani - actress
 Ahad Raza Mir - actor

Journalists
 Suroosh Alvi – journalist and co-founder of VICE magazine

Musicians
 Tariq Hussain – singer-songwriter and radio host
 Qurram Hussain – member of JoSH
 Sohail Rana

TV personalities
 Sabrina Jalees – Canadian comedian
 Adnan Virk – sports anchor for ESPN

Politics
 Salma Ataullahjan – Senator
 Iqra Khalid – current member of the House of Commons of Canada
 Wajid Khan – former member of the House of Commons of Canada
 Yasir Naqvi – former member of the Legislative Assembly of Ontario and Attorney General of Ontario
 Shafiq Qaadri – former member of the Legislative Assembly of Ontario
 Shad Qadri – Ottawa City Councillor for Ward 6
 Shiraz Shariff – former member of the Legislative Assembly of Alberta
 Salma Zahid – current member of the House of Commons of Canada

Sports
 Cecil Pervez - Canadian cricket player
 Qaiser Ali – Canadian cricket player
 Umar Bhatti – Canadian cricket player
 Saad Bin Zafar – Canadian cricketer
 Rizwan Cheema – Canadian cricketer
 Hamza Tariq – Canadian cricketer
 Asif Dar – Canadian boxer
 Mian Hussain – Canadian professional boxer
 Obby Khan – offensive lineman of the Winnipeg Blue Bombers
 Maria Toorpakay Wazir – Pakistani squash player currently resident in Toronto, Ontario

Others
Ali A. Rizvi – writer and podcaster
Zafar Bangash – commentator
Michael John Hamdani – forger
 Abu Huzaifa al-Kanadi – former recruit of the Islamic State group.
Malala Yousafzai – education activist

See also
Canada–Pakistan relations
Pakistani Canadian
List of Pakistani Americans
List of British Pakistanis
List of Pakistani Australians

References

Pakistani diaspora in Canada
Canada